Daniel Edward Stein (born 11 April 1977), better known by his stage name DJ Fresh, is an English musician, DJ, record producer, best known for making electronic music. He is one of the principal members of the drum and bass group Bad Company, alongside Darren White (dBridge), Jason Maldini and Michael Wojcicki (Vegas). He also owns and runs the drum and bass label Breakbeat Kaos with Adam F.

DJ Fresh released his third studio album, Nextlevelism, in October 2012 on Ministry of Sound Recordings, which includes the two number one hit singles "Louder" and "Hot Right Now" – the UK's first dubstep and drum and bass number ones respectively – "The Power", "The Feeling", "Gravity" and "Gold Dust".

DJ Fresh scored his fourth top five single with "Earthquake", a collaboration with Mad Decent label boss Diplo, featuring Dominique Young Unique, "Dibby Dibby Sound", a collaboration with St. Louis producer Jay Fay also featuring the garage vocalist Ms. Dynamite, "Gravity", featuring Ella Eyre and featuring on "Say You Do" by Sigala also featuring Imani.

DJ Fresh has 2.8 million record sales, two number one singles and a further eight top 10 singles to his name. He also has over 157 million plays on his YouTube channel.

Career

Early success and Escape from Planet Monday (1998–2008)

Along with the three other members of Bad Company, Fresh founded the record label BC Recordings, as well as the website Dogs on Acid. Bad Company's track "The Nine", was released in 1998 when Fresh was just 21 years old. "The Nine" was later voted the greatest drum & bass track of all time by readers of Knowledge Magazine

Resuming his solo career in 2002, Fresh founded Breakbeat Punk, which merged with Adam F's Kaos Recordings to become Breakbeat Kaos in 2003. In 2004 Dogs on Acid was given its own imprint.

In 2006, Fresh released his first studio album, Escape from Planet Monday, featuring "The Immortal", "X Project", "Nervous" and "All that Jazz" on Breakbeat Kaos.

Kryptonite and commercial success (2009–2011)
In 2009 Fresh released a 12" of "Heavyweight" (with Fantasia on the B side) on the Digital Soundboy label. "Heavyweight" had a different style from Fresh's usual output, and gained positive reviews and a general positive response through the underground scene and within various radio stations. Fresh subsequently released "Hypercaine" (including a remix from Nero in September 2009) and made BBC Radio 1's daytime playlist.

On 1 August 2010, he re-released his song "Gold Dust" featuring vocals from Ce'Cile, where it peaked 24 in the UK and 39 in Ireland, it marked his first Top 40 hit in both countries. On 16 August, he released his second studio album, "Kryptonite" where it peaked 4 on the UK Dance Chart.

He then released his follow-up single called "Lassitude" with Sigma featuring vocals from Koko. It managed to peak 98 on the UK Singles Chart and 11 on the UK Dance Chart.

Nextlevelism and continued commercial success (2011–2012)
"Louder", the first single from his third album Nextlevelism, was released on 3 July 2011. The song was used as part of a Lucozade Lite advertising campaign in the UK and Ireland. The song features vocals from Welsh singer Sian Evans from the band Kosheen and peaked number 4 on the Irish Singles Chart and was the first ever dubstep number one on the UK Singles Chart.

On 12 February 2012, the second single "Hot Right Now", featuring British singer Rita Ora, became his second number one in the UK, and the first drum and bass song to chart at number one in the UK. The third single from the album, "The Power", which features rapper Dizzee Rascal, was officially released on 3 June 2012.

Following the release of his fourth single, "The Feeling", which features rapper RaVaughn, on 23 September 2012, DJ Fresh released his new album Nextlevelism on 1 October 2012. "Nextlevelism" includes the songs "Hot Right Now", "Louder", "The Power", "Gold Dust", "The Feeling" and features Rita Ora, Dizzee Rascal, Rizzle Kicks, Professor Green, Ms Dynamite, The Fray and Liam Bailey.

2012–2018
Stein started working in 2012 on his fourth studio album. The album's lead single, "Earthquake", is a collaboration with Diplo and Dominique Young Unique. The song was released on 18 August 2013 and managed to reach number four on the UK Singles Chart. An edited version titled "Motherquake" was produced and released specifically for the film Kick-Ass 2. The album's second single, "Dibby Dibby Sound", samples the song "Dibby Dibby" by moombahton producer Jay Fay and features additional vocals from Ms. Dynamite. The song is credited as DJ Fresh vs. Jay Fay. The song received the title of Zane Lowe's "Hottest Record in the World". The third single from the album, "Make U Bounce", is credited as DJ Fresh vs. TC featuring Little Nikki. The song is a reworking of TC's previously unreleased 2012 song "Make You Bounce" and was released on 29 June 2014. The fourth single, "Flashlight", features Ellie Goulding and was released on 28 September 2014. It is a reworking of the original version that appears on Goulding's album Halcyon Days. The fifth single, "Gravity", features Ella Eyre and was released on 8 February 2015. The song appears on Eyre's album Feline.The sixth single, "Believer", with DJ Adam F, was released as a digital download on 7 June 2015. "How Love Begins", with bass DJ and producer High Contrast featuring vocals from English rapper, songwriter, singer, and record producer Dizzee Rascal and uncredited vocals from Clare Maguire. The song was released as a digital download on 5 February 2016 as the seventh single. "Bang Bang", with Diplo featuring vocals from R. City, Selah Sue and Craig David. The song was released as a digital download on 9 December 2016 as the eighth single from Fresh's forthcoming fourth studio album.

2018–present
After surviving cancer in 2017, Fresh changed his focus to his other long running passion of software development. He now works as a machine learning-focused software engineer in Oxfordshire, England.

Discography

Studio albums
 Escape from Planet Monday (2006)
 Kryptonite (2010)
 Nextlevelism (2012)

Awards and nominations

References

External links

 
 

1977 births
Living people
People from Maidenhead
English drum and bass musicians
English DJs
English record producers
Electronic dance music DJs
Place of birth missing (living people)
English people of German descent
Remixers